S. Palani Nadar is an Indian politician. He was elected to Tamil Nadu legislative assembly from Tenkasi constituency in 2021 as an Indian National Congress candidate.

References 

Living people
Year of birth missing (living people)
Tamil Nadu MLAs 2021–2026
Indian National Congress politicians from Tamil Nadu